China Central Airlines, also known as Zhongzhou Airlines, is a Chinese cargo airline based at Zhengzhou Xinzheng International Airport.

History
Central Airlines was originally founded as Homeland Airlines. It was established in 2019. It received its Air Operator's Certificate in April 2020 and started operations the next month. It operates both domestic and international flights with a fleet of three Boeing 737 Freighters. Only one of Central's aircraft is active as of 2020.

Central Airlines was first approved to operate Zhengzhou-Wuxi-Quanzhou/Shenzhen/Haikou flights in 2020. It has expressed interest in operating to Hong Kong, Macau, and Taiwan as well.

Fleet
Central Airline’s fleet consists of the following aircraft:

References

Cargo airlines of China